WarnerTV Serie (formerly TNT Serie) is a German pay television channel dedicated to broadcast television series. The channel was rebranded into WarnerTV Serie on 25 September 2021.

Distribution
The station was operated by Turner Broadcasting System Europe and launched on 28 January 2009. Since 1 June 2009, the channel has broadcast around the clock.

In August 2013, SES Platform Services (later MX1, now part of SES Video) won an international tender by Turner Broadcasting System, to provide playout services for TNT Serie, and for Cartoon Network, Boomerang, CNN International, TNT Film and TNT Comedy (in both SD and HD) for the German-speaking market, digitisation of existing Turner content, and playout for Turner on-demand and catch-up services in  Germany, Austria, Switzerland the Benelux region, from November 2013.

Programming

 2 Broke Girls (2014-2016)
 4 Blocks (2017–present)
 30 Rock (2009-2014)
 Add a Friend (2012-2014)
 Agent X (2015-2016)
 Airwolf (2017–present)
 Animal Kingdom (2017–present)
 APB (APB - Die Hightech-Cops) (2017–present)
 Arrow (2015–present)
 Batman: The Animated Series (2017–present)
 Big Love (2009-2013)
 Boardwalk Empire
 Boston Legal (2016–present)
 Caprica (2011-2013)
 Caroline in the City (2009-2011)
 Channel Zero (2018–present)
 Cold Case (Cold Case - Kein Opfer ist je vergessen) (2010–present)
 Colony (2017–present)
 Columbo (2015–present)
 Dawson's Creek (2011-2013)
 ER (Emergency Room – Die Notaufnahme)
 Everybody Loves Raymond (Alle lieben Raymond)
 Falling Skies (2011-2016)
 Friday Night Lights (2009-2014)
 Friends (2010-2016)
 Fringe (Fringe - Grenzfälle des FBI) (2012-2014)
 Game of Thrones (2011-2017)
 Gilmore Girls (2009-2013, 2016–2017)
 Good Behavior (2016–present)
 Grey's Anatomy (2016–2017)
 Hart to Hart (Hart aber herzlich) (2014-2016)
 Hell on Wheels (2013–present)
 Hot in Cleveland (2014-2016)
 Instinct (2018–present)
 JAG (J.A.G. - Im Auftrag der Ehre) (2018)
 Knight Rider
 Major Crimes (2014–present)
 McLeod's Daughters (McLeods Töchter) (2016–present)
 Men at Work (2013-2016)
 Monday Mornings (2013-2014, 2016–present)
 Monk (2009–present)
 Murder, She Wrote (Mord ist ihr Hobby) (2009–present)
 Murder in the First (2014-2016)
 Nip/Tuck (Nip/Tuck – Schönheit hat ihren Preis)
 Northern Exposure (Ausgerechnet Alaska)
 NTSF:SD:SUV:: (2012–present)
 Parenthood (2016–2017)
 Parks and Recreation (2014-2016)
 Pretty Little Liars (2016–2017)
 Psych
 Public Morals (2015)
 Reign (2016–present)
 Revenge (2016–present)
 Rescue Me (2009-2014)
 Rizzoli & Isles (2012–present)
 Salem (2014-2017)
 SEAL Team (2018–present)
 Seinfeld (2009-2015)
 Signos (Im Zeichen der Rache) (2016–present)
 Six Feet Under (Six Feet Under – Gestorben wird immer)
 Smallville
 Tell Me You Love Me (2009-2010)
 The Big Bang Theory (2012-2015)
 The Black Donnellys
 The Bold and the Beautiful (Reich und Schön) (2022–present)
 The Closer (2015–present)
 The Fixer (2017–present)
 The Flash (2016–present)
 The Frankenstein Chronicles (2016-2017)
 The King of Queens (King of Queens) (2009-2016)
 The Last Ship (2014–present)
 The Millers (2014-2016)
 The O.C. (O.C., California) (2016-2017)
 The Starter Wife (The Starter Wife – Alles auf Anfang)
 The Son (2017–present)
 The Wonder Years (Wunderbare Jahre) (2018–present)
 Third Watch (Third Watch – Einsatz am Limit)
 Those Who Can't (2016)
 'Til Death (Ehe ist ...)
 Titanic: Blood and Steel (2013-2015)
 Two and a Half Men (2010-2016) 
 Weinberg (2015-2016)
 Will (2017–present)
 Without a Trace (Without a Trace – Spurlos verschwunden) (2009-2011, 2017–present)

Adult Swim 

 Aqua Teen Hunger Force (2009-2011, 2014–2017)
 Assy McGee (2010-2011, 2014–2015)
 China, IL (2016-2017)
 Lucy, the Daughter of the Devil (2009-2017)
 Metalocalypse (2010-2012, 2014–2015)
 Moral Orel (2009-2011, 2014–2016)
 Rick and Morty (2014-2016)
 Robot Chicken (2009-2012, 2014–2017)
 Stroker and Hoop (2009-2011, 2013–2016)
 The Brak Show (2009, 2012–2016)
 The Venture Bros. (2009, 2014–2016)
 Your Pretty Face Is Going to Hell (2016-2017)

Sports 
 All Elite Wrestling (2019–present)
 Lucha Underground (2016–2019)

Logos

References

External links 
Official site

Serie
Television stations in Germany
German-language television stations
Turner Broadcasting System Germany
Television channels and stations established in 2009
Warner Bros. Discovery EMEA